Fossalta di Portogruaro is a town in the Metropolitan City of Venice, Veneto, Italy. It is south of A4 and lies 80 km east of Venice.

Sources

External links
(Google Maps)

Cities and towns in Veneto